The Doctor of Ministry (abbreviated DMin or D.Min.) is a professional doctorate, often including a research component, that may be earned by a minister of religion while concurrently engaged in some form of ministry. It is categorized as an advanced program oriented toward ministerial and/or academic leadership. As a terminal professional doctorate, the Doctor of Ministry is primarily concerned with the "acquisition of knowledge and research skills, to further advance or enhance professional practice," and is, therefore, distinct from the Doctor of Philosophy in its aim.

Doctor of Ministry by country/region

United States and Canada 
Under Association of Theological Schools in the United States and Canada (ATS) standards, programs must require matriculants to have earned the degree Master of Divinity (M.Div.) or its equivalent and to have engaged in no fewer than three years of full-time ministry, though some programs require more. The ATS requires students to complete at least one year of coursework followed by the completion of the doctoral dissertation or research project. Normally, the degree requires between three and six years to complete. The degree's purpose is to "enhance the practice of ministry for persons who hold the M.Div. or its educational equivalent and who have engaged in substantial ministerial leadership." As such, Doctor of Ministry concentrations vary by institution and include applied theology, evangelism, pastoral counseling or the psychology of religion, homiletics, spiritual formation, ethics, church growth, church leadership, apologetics and Bible translation.

Australia 
In Australia, under the Australian College of Theology standards, the D.Min. degree is academically equivalent to a Ph.D. or Th.D. within the same Australian Qualifications Framework (AQF level 10) research doctoral award which is to "qualify individuals who apply a substantial body of knowledge to research, investigate and develop new knowledge, in one or more fields of investigation, scholarship or professional practice." As such, the admission requirements, length of study, and the overall academic requirements of the three degrees are the same: candidates must submit a final thesis of 80,000-100,000 words in order to complete the degree.

References

Ministry
Religious degrees